Short track speed skating at the 2018 Winter Olympics was held at the Gangneung Ice Arena in Gangneung, South Korea. The eight events were scheduled to take place between 10 and 22 February 2018.

Qualification

A total quota of 120 athletes were allowed to compete at the Games (60 men and 60 women). Countries were assigned quotas using the results of the entire 2017–18 World Cup in the autumn of 2017. Each nation was permitted to enter a maximum of five athletes per gender if it qualified a relay team and three if it did not. There were a maximum of thirty-two qualifiers for the 500m and 1000m events; thirty-six for the 1500m events; and eight for the relays.

Competition schedule
The following was the competition schedule for all eight events. Sessions that included the event finals are shown in bold.

All times are (UTC+9).

Medal summary

Medal table

Men's events

Women's events

 Skaters who did not participate in the final, but received medals.
 Netherlands set a world record despite not winning gold. They won bronze by default when Canada and China were both disqualified from the medal round (Final A) leaving only two teams to take gold and silver (South Korea and Italy); Netherlands had already won the previous race, the classification round (Final B), in world record time.

Records

Twelve Olympic records (OR) and three world records (WR) were set during the competition.

Participating nations
A total of 115 athletes from 22 nations (including the IOC's designation of Olympic Athletes from Russia) were scheduled to participate (the numbers of athletes are shown in parentheses).

References

External links
Official Results Book – Short track speed skating

 
Short track speed skating
2018
Winter Olympics